The following are the statistics of the Turkish First Football League in season 1984/1985.

Overview
It was contested by 18 teams, and Fenerbahçe S.K. won the championship.

League table

Results

References

Turkey - List of final tables (RSSSF)

Süper Lig seasons
1984–85 in Turkish football
Turkey